The Battle of Jiulianshan (Jiulianshan Zhandou, 九连山战斗) was an unsuccessful counter-guerrilla operation launched by the nationalists against the communists during the Chinese Civil War in the post-World War II era in the border region of Guangdong, Jiangxi and Hunan.

Jiulianshan (Jiulian Mountain, Shan means mountain in Chinese), was a communist guerrilla base in the border region of Guangdong, Jiangxi and Hunan.  In November 1948, the nationalist forces from Guangdong consisted of the 13th Security Regiment, the 5th Regiment, and a battalion of the 1st Security Regiment were dispatched to eradicate the local communist guerrilla.  The nationalists enjoyed both the technical and numerical superiorities, so they decided to attack on multiple fronts in separate directions.  In contrast, the communist guerrilla decided to concentrate their force to achieve numerical superiority in one front against the attacking nationalists, and then fight the enemy at the next front using the same tactic to overcome their own disadvantage.

Order of battle
Nationalists (2,500+ total)
A battalion of the Cantonese 1st Security Regiment
Cantonese 5th Security Regiment
Cantonese 13th Security Regiment
Communists (1,000+ total)
3rd Regiment (battalion-sized) of the communist guerrilla
4th Regiment (battalion-sized) of the communist guerrilla
7th Regiment (battalion-sized) of the communist guerrilla
Independent 5th Group (battalion-sized) of the communist guerrilla

As the nationalists sent their supplies via Dongjiang River upstream from Heyuan (河源) on November 15, 1948, the enemy set up an ambush in the section from Yellow Field (Huang Tian, 黄田) region to White Horse (Bai Ma, 白马) region.  The entire nationalist convoy was lost with over 70 troops killed and over a dozen boats full of supplies fallen into enemy hands.

On November 20, 1948, a group of communist guerrilla faked the attack on Great Lake (Da Hu, 大湖) region, and as the nationalist 1st Security Regiment sent out a company to engage the enemy, the enemy immediately retreated, lured the unsuspecting nationalists into the preset ambush in the Lion's Brain (Shi Zi Nao, 狮子脑) mountains, where the communist guerrilla 3rd Regiment was waiting, and the entire nationalist company was wiped out.

Due to the previous loss of supplies in the November last year, the nationalists were forced to re-supply.  On January 8, 1949, 5 infantry companies and one artillery companies of the nationalist 13th Security Regiment totaling 600 troops organized another convoy consisted of three boats of supplies went upstream again in Dongjiang River.  The communist guerilla concentrated its 3rd Regiment, 5th Regiment, 7th Regiment and Independent 5th Group totaling 1,000 to ambush the convoy was when the nationalists were stopping at the riverbank.  On January 11, 1949, after a nine-hour-long fierce battle that lasted from noon till 9:00 PM, the nationalists managed to successfully breakout, but all of the suppliers had lost to the enemy in addition to suffering over 190 fatalities.  After this setback, the nationalists cancelled any further plans to eradicate the communist guerrilla and withdrew all of its deployed forces.

The nationalist failure was mainly caused by the grave underestimation of the enemy's strength and determination.  Although the so-called communist guerrilla regiments were actually only battalion sized, they could still be a sizable and formidable force when they were concentrated together.  In contrast, although the nationalist enjoyed both the technical and numerical superiority, they did not have advantage when their forces were deployed separately in smaller numbers.

See also
List of battles of the Chinese Civil War
National Revolutionary Army
History of the People's Liberation Army
Chinese Civil War

References

Zhu, Zongzhen and Wang, Chaoguang, Liberation War History, 1st Edition, Social Scientific Literary Publishing House in Beijing, 2000,  (set)
Zhang, Ping, History of the Liberation War, 1st Edition, Chinese Youth Publishing House in Beijing, 1987,  (pbk.)
Jie, Lifu, Records of the Liberation War: The Decisive Battle of Two Kinds of Fates, 1st Edition, Hebei People's Publishing House in Shijiazhuang, 1990,  (set)
Literary and Historical Research Committee of the Anhui Committee of the Chinese People's Political Consultative Conference, Liberation War, 1st Edition, Anhui People's Publishing House in Hefei, 1987, 
Li, Zuomin, Heroic Division and Iron Horse: Records of the Liberation War, 1st Edition, Chinese Communist Party History Publishing House in Beijing, 2004, 
Wang, Xingsheng, and Zhang, Jingshan, Chinese Liberation War, 1st Edition, People's Liberation Army Literature and Art Publishing House in Beijing, 2001,  (set)
Huang, Youlan, History of the Chinese People's Liberation War, 1st Edition, Archives Publishing House in Beijing, 1992, 
Liu Wusheng, From Yan'an to Beijing: A Collection of Military Records and Research Publications of Important Campaigns in the Liberation War, 1st Edition, Central Literary Publishing House in Beijing, 1993, 
Tang, Yilu and Bi, Jianzhong, History of Chinese People's Liberation Army in Chinese Liberation War, 1st Edition, Military Scientific Publishing House in Beijing, 1993 – 1997,  (Volum 1), 7800219615 (Volum 2), 7800219631 (Volum 3), 7801370937 (Volum 4), and 7801370953 (Volum 5)

Conflicts in 1948
Conflicts in 1949
Battles of the Chinese Civil War
1948 in China
1949 in China
Military history of Guangdong